Dibble Basin is an undersea basin in the Antarctic Ocean. The name was approved by the Advisory Committee on Undersea Features in December 1971.

References 

Oceanic basins of the Southern Ocean